Krum is a city in Denton County, Texas, United States. The population was 4,157 at the 2010 census, more than doubling its 2000 census population of 1,984. By 2020, its population was 5,483.

Geography

Demographics

As of the 2020 United States census, there were 5,483 people, 1,739 households, and 1,216 families residing in the city.

Education
Krum is served by the Krum Independent School District.

Notable people

 Jason Lee lives in Krum with his family
 The Quebe Sisters Band violin and vocal stars: Grace, Hulda and Sophia Quebe  grew up in Krum.

Notes

References

Bibliography
 Della Isbell Davis, Krum, Texas the Story of a Small Town (originally published in 1976).
 Kathleen E. and Clifton R. St. Clair, eds., Little Towns of Texas (Jacksonville, Texas: Jayroe Graphic Arts, 1982).

External links
City of Krum official website
Krum ISD
 Krum Heritage Museum
Cub Scout Pack 136, serving Krum
Boy Scouts Troop 136, serving Krum
Krum United Methodist Church register, 1886-1925, hosted by the Portal to Texas History

Dallas–Fort Worth metroplex
Cities in Texas
Cities in Denton County, Texas
Populated places established in 1886
1886 establishments in Texas